Schlafen family member 14 is a protein that in humans is encoded by the SLFN14 gene.

Function

The protein encoded by this gene plays an important role in platelet formation and function. Defects in this gene are a cause of thrombocytopenia with excessive bleeding. [provided by RefSeq, Jul 2016].

References

Further reading